Juan de Dios Rivas Margalef (born 7 July 1999), commonly known as Juande, is a Spanish professional footballer who plays for Málaga CF as a central defender.

Club career
Born in Córdoba, Andalusia, Juande joined Málaga CF's youth setup in 2014, aged 14. He made his senior debut with the reserves on 2 September 2018, starting in a 1–3 Segunda División B away loss against Marbella FC.

Juande made his first-team debut on 14 January 2020, starting in a 1–0 home win over SD Ponferradina in the Segunda División. On 6 August, he signed his first professional contract, agreeing to a deal until 2023, and was definitely promoted to the main squad on 5 October, being assigned the number 5 shirt.

References

External links
Málaga CF profile 

1999 births
Living people
Footballers from Córdoba, Spain
Spanish footballers
Association football defenders
Segunda División players
Segunda División B players
Tercera División players
Atlético Malagueño players
Málaga CF players